Phragmacossia furiosa is a species of moth of the family Cossidae. It is found in Afghanistan and Tajikistan.

References

Moths described in 1943
Zeuzerinae